Launde Big Wood is a  biological Site of Special Scientific Interest east of Leicester. It is part of Launde Woods nature reserve, which is owned by the Leicester Diocesan Board of Finance and managed by the Leicestershire and Rutland Wildlife Trust.

This wood on heavy clay is dominated by ash, and in some areas by wych elm. The ground layer has flora typical of ancient clay woods, such as bluebell, forget-me-not, yellow archangel and giant bellflower.

There is access to the site by a public footpath.

References

Sites of Special Scientific Interest in Leicestershire